Otopeni Stadium is a multi-use stadium in Otopeni, Romania. It is currently used mostly for football matches and was the home ground of CS Otopeni. The stadium holds 1,300 people.

CS Otopeni
Football venues in Romania